Mojca Osojnik (born 29 June 1970) is a Slovene painter and illustrator, best known for her children's books illustrations.

Osojnik was born in Kranj in 1970. She graduated from the Academy of Fine Arts in Ljubljana in 1997 and obtained her Master's degree in 2001. From 2001 to 2003 she lived and worked in Los Alamos. She has participated at numerous art exhibitions in Slovenia and abroad. She also works as a children's book illustrator, some of which she has also written herself.

In 2003 she won the Levstik Award for her book Hiša, ki bi rada imela sonce (The House That Wanted to Be in the Sun).

Published works

Author and illustrator
 To je Ernest (This Is Ernest), 1997
 Hiša, ki bi rada imela sonce (The House That Wanted to Be in the Sun), 2001
 Polž Vladimir gre na štop (Vladimir the Snail Goes Hitchhiking), 2003
 Kako je gnezdila sraka Sofija (How Sofia the Magpie Made Her Nest), 2005

Illustrator
 Koroške ljudske pravljice in pripovedke (Carinthian Folk Tales and Fables) by Vinko Möderndorfer, 1992
 Moji pridni otroci (My Good Children) by Sonja Wakounig, 1992
 O mrožku, ki si ni hotel striči nohtov (About Little Walrus Who Didn't Want to Cut His Nails) by Peter Svetina, 1999
 Čas je velika smetanova torta (Time Is a Big Chocolate Cake) by Miha Mazzini, 1999
 Mrožek dobi očala (Little Walrus' New Glasses) by Peter Svetina, 2003

References

1970 births
Living people
Slovenian illustrators
Slovenian children's writers
Slovenian women children's writers
Slovenian children's book illustrators
Slovenian women illustrators
Artists from Kranj
Levstik Award laureates
University of Ljubljana alumni
Slovenian women artists